ŽOK Lovćen (Ženski odbojkaški klub Lovćen) is a Montenergin women's volleyball club founded in 1980. Based in Cetinje, ŽOK Lovćen often participate in Montenegrin women's volley league and Second League.

History
Volleyball club Lovćen is founded at 1980, but women section played only friendlies during the 80's. At the period from 1990 to 2010, volleyball clubs on Cetinje doesn't existed. 
Club was reactivated at 2011, and played their first official season in Montenegrin Second League at 2012-13. Biggest success of ŽOK Lovćen was participation in Montenegrin women's volley league 2014-15.

Record by seasons
Below is a list of ŽOK Lovćen seasons in Montenegrin women's volleyball competitions.

Sources:

See also
 Montenegrin women's volley league
 Montenegrin women's volleyball Cup
 Volleyball Federation of Montenegro (OSCG)
 SD Lovćen Cetinje
 Cetinje

References

External links
 Volleyball Federation of Montenegro

Lovćen Cetinje
Montenegrin volleyball clubs